Yuxarı Zeynəddin (also, Yukhary Zeynaddin) is a village and municipality in the Agdash Rayon of Azerbaijan. The municipality consists of the villages of Yuxarı Zeynəddin and Ağalı.

References 

Populated places in Agdash District